Woodside High School is a mixed 11–16 comprehensive school located in the Wood Green area of the London Borough of Haringey, England.  With a student roll of 1200, the school has been judged by Ofsted as outstanding for two consecutive inspections (2011 and 2014).

In September 2006, the school was renamed from 'White Hart Lane secondary school' to 'Woodside High School'. Having had a chequered reputation, its head teacher Joan McVittie decided to give the school a make-over, with new uniforms and a new reputation. The school is now one of the best schools in Haringey, being 3rd in the Haringey league tables and in the top 25 of the most improved schools in the country. It carries a new reputation that is highly valued by the students. The school was built in 1962.

History
The history of Woodside High School can be traced back through a number of renamings and mergers since its first predecessor schools were founded in 1884. In 1884 separate boys' and girls' Higher Grade schools were founded in Wood Green but by 1898 had become overcrowded and in 1899 merged when they both moved into a new building in Bounds Green Road. Wood Green Higher Grade school, as it was called, was taken over by the Middlesex education committee in 1921, closed and then reopened as Trinity county grammar school. Technical education, started in 1892 under the Technical Instruction Act of 1889, developed quickly after the opening of Tottenham Polytechnic in 1897.

Wood Green county school was established by Middlesex County Council in Glendale Avenue as a mixed grammar school in 1910 and was later renamed Glendale county school. It amalgamated with Trinity county grammar to form Wood Green Grammar school in 1962 and then moved to White Hart Lane, leaving the Glendale Avenue site for Woodside school whilst Trinity county grammar's premises were taken over by the newly established Parkwood school. St. Thomas More upper school took over the Glendale Avenue site in 1967 and at the same time Wood Green Grammar became Wood Green comprehensive school. The new Wood Green comprehensive school also absorbed boys from Woodside school and some girls from Parkwood school.

In Tottenham in 1901, Tottenham County School was founded at Grove House in anticipation of the Education Act 1902. It was the first school that offered an alternative to the Tottenham Grammar School in the area and was also the first co-educational school of its kind in Middlesex. It originally shared Grove House with Tottenham polytechnic but in 1913 moved into a new building on the Green. Like Tottenham high school for girls, established in 1885, it was modelled on the grammar school and these three schools along with the Roman Catholic St. Ignatius's college, provided for Tottenham's educational needs. Tottenham County School in 1963 moved to new buildings at Selby Road, Devonshire Hill, next to the playing fields. In 1967, Tottenham county school premises were taken over by Tottenham school and by 1972 a sixth-form centre and a sports hall had been added.
 
In 1983 Tottenham School vacated the site when it merged with Wood Green comprehensive school and became White Hart Lane School, the premises on Selby Road later becoming the Selby Centre. In 2006 the school once again changed its name becoming Woodside High School.

Location and buildings
The school is located on White Hart Lane in Wood Green, in the London Borough of Haringey, North London. It is central to many sport facilities such as a football ground and tennis court opposite the building, New River sport centre and a rugby field for London Scholars rugby league are also nearby. The school is approximately a 20-minute walk from Wood Green Shopping Centre

Redevelopments
Over the past few years, the school has approximately spent 650 million pounds on refurbishment and rebuilding works.
The school now benefits from a number of facilities, new buildings and technology. A new school for children with disabilities was built on site with Woodside and was named Riverside School.

Specialist and academy status
The school was given specialist status in Business and Enterprise in September 2004. The school converted to academy status in December 2011.

Ofsted reports
The Ofsted Inspections in 2011 and 2014 both rated the school as outstanding. In recent years the school's reports have increased dramatically. The most recent inspection, on 23 Feb 2022 rated the school as good.

Notable former pupils

Wood Green County School
 Stanley Owen Green (1915–1993), known as the Protein Man, a human billboard who became a well-known figure in central London in the latter half of the 20th century 
 Nicko McBrain (born 1954), drummer for Iron Maiden

Glendale County School
 Sir William Connor, journalist who wrote under the name Cassandra
 Prof Sidney William Wooldridge , the first Professor of Geography at King's College London (KCL) in 1944

Wood Green Grammar School
Trevor Phillips  (born 31 December 1953), writer, broadcaster and former politician

Trinity County Grammar School
 Jack Good (producer), who produced Six-Five Special and played with Lord Rockingham's XI on their 1958 No.1 hit Hoots Mon (There's a moose loose aboot this hoose!) 
 James Grout, actor
 Sir Ernest Harrison , former Chief Executive of Racal, largely responsible for creating Vodafone
 Jack Hawkins  (1910–1973), actor who worked on stage and in film from the 1930s until the 1970s 
 Norrie Paramor, record producer and music conductor 
 Kenneth Wilkinson, audio engineer for Decca Records

Tottenham County School
 Deryck Abel (1918–1965), author and political activist
 Maj Alfred Cecil Herring  (1888–1966), recipient of the Victoria Cross
 Lancelot Thomas Hogben , (1895–1975), experimental zoologist and medical statistician 
 John Henry Marks  (born 30 May 1925) – the Chairman of the British Medical Association from 1984 to 1990
 Julia McKenzie, actress
 Roy Perry, Conservative MEP from 1994 to 1999 for Wight and Hampshire South (European Parliament constituency)
 Prof Ralph Raphael , Professor of Organic Chemistry, and Head of Department of Organic and Inorganic Chemistry from 1972 to 1988 at the University of Cambridge, and Regius Professor of Chemistry from 1957 to 1972 at the University of Glasgow
 Sir Norman Rowntree , President from 1975 to 1976 of the Institution of Civil Engineers
 Joseph Ivor Silk  (born 3 December 1942), former Savilian Chair of Astronomy at the University of Oxford

White Hart Lane Secondary School
 Ali Jawad, paralympic medalist and former professional powerlifter

References

Evening Standard Article 20 April 2005

External links
Official website
BBC Education page on the school
Haringey Councils School information page

Academies in the London Borough of Haringey
Secondary schools in the London Borough of Haringey
Wood Green